"Fifteen" is a song written and recorded by American singer-songwriter Taylor Swift for her second studio album, Fearless (2008). Produced by Swift and Nathan Chapman, it is a country pop song with narrative lyrics inspired by Swift's freshman year of high school. In the lyrics, Swift and her high school friend Abigail Anderson, both at fifteen, go through teenage love and heartbreak together. Swift included the track on Fearless after Anderson consented to the personal references. The lyrics mentioning Anderson's disappointment after she "gave everything she had to a boy who changed his mind" received criticism for its allegedly sex-negative connotation.

The song was released to US country radio on August 31, 2009, by Big Machine Records. Swift partnered with electronics retailer Best Buy for "@15", a program that allowed teens to help decide how funds would be distributed among charities. "Fifteen" peaked at number 23 on the US Billboard Hot 100 and was certified double platinum by the Recording Industry Association of America (RIAA). In Canada, the single peaked at number 19 on the Canadian Hot 100 and was certified gold by Music Canada. Music critics lauded Swift's songwriting craftsmanship on "Fifteen" for portraying teenage experiences with vivid storytelling and catchy hooks, with many picking it as a highlight on Fearless.

The single won a Teen Choice Award for Choice Country Song. Roman White directed the music video for "Fifteen", which was filmed using a green screen and features Swift walking through a garden, where she relives many memories with Anderson. It received a nomination for Best Female Video at the 2010 MTV Video Music Awards. Swift included "Fifteen" on the regular set lists of her first two headlining tours, Fearless (2009–10) and Speak Now (2011–12), and on select dates of her later tours, 1989 (2015) and Reputation (2018). She released a re-recorded version, "Fifteen (Taylor's Version)", as part of her re-recorded album Fearless (Taylor's Version), on April 9, 2021.

Background
Swift began writing "Fifteen" with the lyric "And Abigail gave everything she had to a boy/ Who changed his mind/ We both cried", which eventually became the song's bridge, and continued writing everything else in a backwards manner. The song was written about Swift's freshman year of high school at Hendersonville High School, where she met her then best friend Abigail Anderson. "I just decided I really wanted to tell that story about our first year of high school because I felt in my freshman year, I grew up more than any year in my life so far", Swift stated. The events it focused on were how both Swift and Anderson fell in love for the first time, but both suffered heartbreaks. Aside from reminiscing on the events she and Anderson experienced, Swift wrote cautionary lyrics, intended to target teenage girls entering or already in their freshman year of high school. She described it as incorporating things she wished someone would have told her in a song when she was younger. "The thing about high school, you don't know anything. You don't know anything, but you think you know everything", Swift said.

After the completion of composing "Fifteen", Swift became very nervous to show Anderson the song, for she did not know how her friend would respond. "It was a really personal song, especially from her angle of it." However, when Swift performed the song for Anderson and asked whether she was comfortable with the song, Anderson confirmed: "She said, 'Does it bother you that your name is in a song that's so personal?' And it really doesn't just because of the way Taylor and I feel about it. If one girl can kind of learn from it or connect to a song like that, it's totally worth it." With Anderson's consent, Swift recorded "Fifteen" with producer Nathan Chapman, who produced all but one track on Swift's 2006 eponymous debut album, Taylor Swift. Recording the highly personal track caused Swift to cry. Swift attributed the event to the fact that she is most likely to cry over when her loved ones undergo pain, as she witnesses it, rather than her own experiences. She went to say "Fifteen" usually gets her every time.

Composition

"Fifteen" is a country pop song with a length of four minutes and 55 seconds. It is set in common time and has a moderate tempo of 96 beats per minute. The track is categorized as a ballad. It is written in the key of G major and Swift's vocals spans a little over one octave, from G3 to C5. It follows the chord progression Gsus2–Csus2–Em–Csus2. It concludes with an outro that consists of Swift singing "la la la" and rephrasing the song's opening lines.

Grady Smith of Rolling Stone listed  "Fifteen" as one of the "countriest" songs Swift has ever released, stating the song was a good counterpart to the more radio-friendly "Love Story" and "You Belong With Me" during the Fearless-era.

The lyrics of "Fifteen" have Swift narrating about multiple events. In the first verse, Swift details first entering high school with intentions of merely staying out of her peers' way. The second verse bears Swift meeting Anderson and gossiping about the school's queen bees with her. Successively, Swift describes first dates and falling in love for the first time. However, Swift and Anderson become heartbroken, revealing that Anderson "gave everything she had" to someone who later changed his mind. The song's refrains have Swift cautioning young girls to not fall in love easily and acknowledging that she came to the realization of being able to accomplish more than dating a football team member.

Critical reception
The song was met with widespread critical acclaim. Jody Rosen of Rolling Stone believed "Fifteen" was exemplary in that "Swift is a songwriting savant with an intuitive gift for verse-chorus-bridge architecture". Rosen compared her songwriting in the track to that of producers Dr. Luke and Max Martin, whom he referred to as "Swedish pop gods". He continued, "Her music mixes an almost impersonal professionalism — it's so rigorously crafted it sounds like it has been scientifically engineered in a hit factory — with confessions that are squirmingly intimate and true." Jonathon Keefe of Slant Magazine considered the bridge one of the nicer moments of Fearless, but was unimpressed with Swift's singing, particularly in the outro. Stephen Thomas Erlewine of AllMusic found "Fifteen", in which Swift portrayed the role of a big sister instead of a big star, to be one of the best and the most personal song on Fearless. Ken Tucker of Billboard magazine believed "Fifteen" could appeal with teenagers looking for hope and adult women reminiscing the past. Leah Greenbelt of Entertainment Weekly stated, "When she sings about sexuality, she sounds like a real teen, not some manufactured vixen-Lolita".

Jon Caramanica of The New York Times said "Fifteen" was one of Swift's best-written songs. James Reed of The Boston Globe believed "Fifteen" was one of Fearlesss most interesting songs and stated he could visualize the lyrics of the song scribbled in a diary that chronicled Swift's freshman year in high school. Josh Love of The Village Voice called the song a "standout" on the album and found it a refreshing contradiction to typical, idealistic country songs. Prior to its single release, Kate Kiefer of Paste magazine suggested for the song be released as a single from Fearless, adding that she loved it. Alexis Petridis of The Guardian called the track a fantastically good song that broadened "her potential market from teenage girls to anyone who used to be a teenage girl". Petridis continued, "You applaud her skill, while feeling slightly unsettled by the thought of a teenager pontificating away like Yoda." Aidan Vaziri of San Francisco Chronicle ranked it twelfth on his top 12 singles of 2009 list, commenting, "Damn it if this song isn't too sweet, too vulnerable and just too real to ignore." On a negative side, some critics took issue with the alleged themes of idealized femininity and virginity, interpreting the lyrics mentioning Anderson's disappointment after she "gave everything she had to a boy who changed his mind" as sex-negative and encouraging the idea of submissive femininity.

Release and commercial performance
Following the release of Fearless, on the week ending November 29, 2008, "Fifteen" debuted at number seventy-nine on the Billboard Hot 100 Its appearance, along with six other songs, on the chart tied Swift with Hannah Montana (Miley Cyrus) for the female act to have the most songs charting on the Billboard Hot 100 in the same week, a record later surpassed by Swift herself when she charted sixteen songs at once in 2020. It re-entered at number ninety-four on the week ending October 3, 2009, after its single release.

"Fifteen" was released to US country radio on August 31, 2009, by Big Machine Records. On the week ending December 19, 2009, "Fifteen" reached its peak at number twenty-three on the Billboard Hot 100, and, on the week ending February 6, 2010, spent its last week at number forty, after twenty-one weeks on the chart. The song is one of thirteen songs from Fearless charted within the top forty of the Billboard Hot 100, breaking the record for the most top forty entries from a single album. The single was certified double platinum by the Recording Industry Association of America. As of November 2017, "Fifteen" has sold over 1.5 million copies in the United States.

"Fifteen" debuted at number forty-one on Hot Country Songs. It jumped at number thirty-one on its second week and on the week-ending November 7, 2009, it entered the top ten at number ten. Six weeks later, it reached its peak at number seven on the week-ending December 12, 2009. The single became her second single that did not reach the top three of Hot Country Songs since her debut single "Tim McGraw". "Fifteen" also peak at number ten on Pop Songs, number twelve on Adult Contemporary, and at number fourteen at Adult Pop Songs.

On the week ending January 23, 2010, the song peaked at number nineteen in Canada. It was certified gold by Music Canada for sales of 40,000 digital downloads. "Fifteen" peaked at number forty-eight in Australia on the week ending December 13, 2009.

Music video
The music video for "Fifteen" was directed by Roman White, who previously directed Swift's music video "You Belong with Me". White began with the intention of creating a video different than others Swift did in the past. To do so, he believed he needed to set the video outside of high school. White explained, "Well, I think I really wanted this video to kind of be an evolution for Taylor [...] I actually said to her, 'I don't think we should shoot in a high school.' And I don't think she wanted to either." White conceptualized the video's setting  by taking into account the literal meaning of the song and transforming into something new. He conceptualized the setting to be a new world where Swift could revisit her memories, as they manifest around her. "Let's take the literal meaning of this song and watch it evolve in front of us ... almost as a memory in your head. And create this world, somewhere you walk in on this desolate desert and you start to sing about all these great memories you have... of everything you love blooming around you, and so we literally grew this garden around her", White said.  The world moved from one situation to the next. White decided to annex surreal elements to create a cross between a garden and the heart of the memories. He intertwined Swift's emotions with the growth of the garden. The garden grew when Swift felt happy, but at the sight of pain and negative emotions, clouds appear and the garden dies, which also symbolized Swift's best friend Abigail Anderson's broken heart.

Swift's friend, Anderson, portrayed herself in the video. The love interests of both Swift and Anderson were cast by Swift after she received images of them via e-mail. The video was filmed in two days. The first day consisted of actors, including Swift and Anderson, filming before a green screen. On the set, White presented Swift with caricature drawings depicting the music video, in order to guide herself. Swift was impressed by Anderson's acting skills, considering her lack of experience, and called it "prolific". On the second day, scenes at a high school were filmed; artificial rain was made. Afterward, White and a team of visual effect artists created the setting. "If you watch just the offline edit of this video, it's just green. It's just Taylor walking around a giant green screen. And to think that every single thing in that video was created is amazing, 'cause a lot of people worked really hard on it", White said. The visual effects team were at work for the video for some time, sometimes staying overnight in the office to produce the video. The direction was to make the video seem "magical". Some of the props used when filming were recreated using digital animation, such as the door and the desks. Because extras were filmed separately, White was meticulous to find the right shots to make the scene more cohesive. White believed the finished product had a sense of innocence.

The video begins with Swift, barefoot and clad in a white sundress, approaching a tall, arched doorway which materializes in the middle of a barren landscape. Swift looks at a photograph of herself and her friend tucked into the arch and, then, passes through the doors. On the other side of the arch, animated flowers and vines grow across the scenes. People and objects from a high school fade in and out of view. Swift walks through the memories and begins to play an acoustic guitar beneath a tree. Afterward, Anderson appears, sitting at a desk before a chalkboard in the field of flowers. Swift sits down beside her and the two begin to whisper and laugh to each other. In the next scene, Swift plays a namesake Taylor brand guitar while Anderson goes on her first date; she kisses her date, but pushes him away when he tries to go further. Her love interest and all surroundings dissolve to show Anderson sitting alone on a stone bench. Swift approaches her and hugs her tightly as the field around them turns dark and stormy. The video then alternates between Swift singing in the rain and hugging her friend. After the landscape deteriorates, the video transitions to reality, where Swift, wearing a black trench coat, stands in the rain, across the street from a high school. Swift then sees a student at the entrance; the two make eye contact and the video concludes. To date, the video has over 150 million views on YouTube.

Video reception
The music video premiered on October 9, 2009 on CMT. Peter Gicas of E! thought the video was "sweet" and said, "And while the visuals here—Taylor walking in and out of various animated scenes—are certainly nice to look at, they nevertheless take a back seat to the country star's cuteness." Leah Greenblatt of Entertainment Weekly graded the video a B. Greenblatt believed the video was reverential and painterly, but criticized it by saying "Fifteen"'s most powerful lyrics were outdone by the dreamy design. Jocelyn Vena of MTV wrote, "Taylor Swift is 'Fifteen' all over again in the new music video for her song of the same name." At the 2010 MTV Video Music Awards, the video was nominated for the MTV Video Music Award for Best Female Video, but lost to Lady Gaga's video for "Bad Romance" (2009).

Accolades
{| class="wikitable"
|+ Accolades for "Fifteen"
! Year
! Organization
! Award
! Result
! Ref.
|-
! scope="row" rowspan="4"| 2010
| rowspan=2|BMI Awards
| Award-Winning Songs
| 
| rowspan="2" style="text-align:center;"|
|-
| Publisher of the Year 
|
|-
| MTV Video Music Awards
|  Best Female Video
| 
| 
|-
| Teen Choice Awards
| Choice Country Song
| 
|

Live performances

Swift first performed "Fifteen", as a duet with singer Miley Cyrus, at the 51st Annual Grammy Awards. The duo sat on wooden stools for the acoustic performance, with Swift wearing a baggy beige dress layered over a tight black outfit and playing an acoustic guitar. Swift has also performed the song at We're All for the Hall, a benefit concert organized by Country Music Hall of Fame and Museum, the 2009 CMA Music Festival, the 2009 V Festival, the Australian charity concert Sydney Sound Relief, and the Country Music Association Awards. In the United Kingdom, Swift performed "Fifteen" on Later... with Jools Holland and The Paul O'Grady Show.

Swift performed the song on all venues in 2009 and 2010 of her first headlining concert tour, the Fearless Tour. The performances of "Fifteen" set on a small platform located at the opposite end, parallel to the stage in the arena. Swift, dressed in a pastel sundress, sat on a wooden stool while performing with wooden 12-string acoustic guitar strapped to her shoulder. Nicole Frehsee of Rolling Stone favored Swift's performance of "Tim McGraw" at the August 27, 2009 concert at Madison Square Garden in New York City. Frehsee described the entire concert as an "elaborate spectacle that doesn't slow down, even when the singer hauls her acoustic guitar into the audience to play a sweet, stripped down set of tunes including 'Fifteen'." "Fifteen" served as a performance on the setlist of Swift's second concert tour, the Speak Now World Tour (2011); the performances featured Swift sitting and playing an acoustic guitar, wearing a blue cocktail dress.

Swift performed the song during her 1989 World Tour in place of "You Are In Love" on selected dates, such as the shows in Indianapolis and Atlanta. She also performed the acoustic version of the song on Formula 1 Grand Prix on October 22, 2016 at Austin, Texas. This song was most recently performed on her Reputation Stadium Tour during the second show in London, in place of "All Too Well", in honor of the concert being the fifteenth show of the tour.

@15
Swift partnered with electronics retailer Best Buy for @15, a program that allowed teens to help decide how Best Buy's "@15 Fund" would be distributed among various charities. Swift taped a Public Service Announcement (PSA), called a "Teen Service Announcement" by Best Buy, for @15. Within the PSA, which was released on February 9, 2009, scenes of Swift reminiscing on high school and encouraging originality and uniqueness were inter-cut with scenes of her singing "Fifteen". In June 2009, @15 became a partner for Swift's Fearless Tour. The announcement was shown at each stop during the North American leg of the tour. In fifteen tour stops, @15 donated forty concert tickets and a guitar autographed by Swift to local teen-oriented charity groups, such as chapters of Boys & Girls Clubs of America and Big Brothers Big Sisters.

Personnel
Adapted from the liner notes of Fearless
 Taylor Swift – vocals, songwriter, producer
 Nathan Chapman – producer
 Drew Bollman – assistant mixer
 Chad Carlson – recording engineer
 Justin Niebank – mixer

Charts

Weekly charts

Year-end charts

Certifications

"Fifteen (Taylor's Version)"

"Fifteen (Taylor's Version)" is the re-recorded version of "Fifteen" by American singer-songwriter Taylor Swift. The track is written by Swift and produced by Swift and Christopher Rowe. It was released on April 9, 2021, through Republic Records, as the second track on Fearless (Taylor's Version), the re-recording of Fearless. An official lyric video of the re-recording was released to YouTube.

"Fifteen (Taylor's Version)" was well received by critics, who praised Swift's more mature vocals as adding depth to the song. Upon the release of the album, the song charted in Australia, Canada, and the United States, and also appeared in the top 20 of the Hot Country Songs chart.

Background
On February 11, 2021, Swift announced a re-recording of "Fifteen", titled "Fifteen (Taylor's Version)", as part of Fearless (Taylor's Version), the re-recorded version of Fearless. The album was released on April 9, 2021.

Critical reception
Critics generally praised "Fifteen (Taylor's Version)". NME's Hannah Mylrea called it one of Swift's most moving songs, while also remarking that lines such as "Back then I swore I was gonna marry him someday / But I realised some bigger dreams of mine" cut deeper 10 years later. Alexandra Pollard of The Independent expressed similar sentiments, saying that there was "an added layer" to "Fifteen (Taylor's Version)" and songs like it on the album. Writing for Gigwise, Kelsey Barnes wrote that "the small vocal changes in 'Fifteen (Taylor's Version)' which means so much more when you think about her now, at 31, and all of the fans that have grown up alongside her since then", saying that Swift's age could be heard and felt "in the best way".

Charts

References

2008 songs
2009 singles
Taylor Swift songs
2000s ballads
Music videos directed by Roman White
Songs written by Taylor Swift
Song recordings produced by Taylor Swift
Song recordings produced by Nathan Chapman (record producer)
Song recordings produced by Chris Rowe
Big Machine Records singles
Songs about teenagers
Songs based on actual events
Songs about friendship
Pop ballads
Country ballads
Country pop songs